Badrai is a Nullah which runs in  Swabi district of Khyber Pakhtunkhwa. It originates in the mountains of Buner district approximately at  34°25'54" N, 72°40'9" E  near Makhranai village  to the west of River Indus and runs towards the south to pass along Charorai Kalay. It runs further south in District Swabi crossing near villages Panjtar & Ghurghushto where it is joined by small tributaries. Further south it passes to the west of villages Tutalai, Salim Khan, Manerai, Swabi, Kala, Dara, Panj Pir and  Kaddi.  An irrigation canal has been siphoned underneath Badrai at village Kaddi in Swabi district which is a prominent feature of the village.

Changing its course to the west it passes to the south of villages Zaida, Khunda and Ambar running parallel to the River Indus which it eventually meets.

References

Rivers of Khyber Pakhtunkhwa
Rivers of Pakistan